Michael Clegg is the name of:

Michael Clegg (footballer) (born 1977), English footballer
Michael Clegg (naturalist) (1933–1995), British museum curator, naturalist, and television presenter
Michael T. Clegg (born 1941), American plant geneticist